Sheykh Sorkh ol Din or Sheykh Sorkh od Din may refer to:
Sheykh Sorkh ol Din-e Olya
Sheykh Sorkh ol Din-e Sofla